This list of cemeteries in Nevada includes currently operating, historical (closed for new interments), and defunct (graves abandoned or removed) cemeteries, columbaria, and mausolea which are historical and/or notable. It does not include pet cemeteries.

Clark County 

 Goodsprings Cemetery, near Jean
 St. Thomas Memorial Cemetery, Overton; NRHP-listed
 Southern Nevada Veterans Memorial Cemetery, Boulder City
 Woodlawn Cemetery, Las Vegas; NRHP-listed

Lander County 
 Austin Cemetery, Austin; NRHP-listed

Lyons County 
 Northern Nevada Veterans Memorial Cemetery, near Fernley

See also
 List of cemeteries in the United States
 Pioneer cemetery

References

Nevada